Turhan Feyzioğlu (1922 – 24 March 1988) was a Turkish academic and a politician.

Early life
He was born in Kayseri. After finishing the primary school in Kayseri, he studied in Galatasaray High School and in Law school of Istanbul University. After post graduate studies in United Kingdom, he returned to Turkey and became a professor of Ankara University. In 1955, he was elected as the dean of Political Sciences School in Ankara University. He also began writing in the bulletin of his school. His articles however irritated the Democrat Party government and he had to resign. Although in 1960–1961 term he briefly returned to academics and served as the rector of Middle East Technical University (METU) in Ankara, his main area of interest was politics.

Politics in CHP
In 1957 he went into politics and became a member of Republican People's Party (CHP). In the same year he was elected as the MP from Sivas Province. In 1960 (during his service in METU) he also served in the constituent assembly and was appointed as the minister of education in Cabinet Gürsel I. 
In the elections held in 1961, he was elected as the MP from Kayseri Province, his home. He served in the two governments of İsmet İnönü In the first he served as state minister and in the second as deputy prime minister. Turhan Feyzioğlu was one of the major figures of the party. But beginning by 1965, Bülent Ecevit the secretary general of the party who had the support of İsmet İnönü began to challenge his authority in the party. Turhan Feyzioğlu struggled against Ecevit’s slogan "left of center".

Politics in Reliance Party
On 12 May 1967 Turhan Feyzioğlu and his 47 followers in the parliamentary group broke away from CHP to form a new party named Reliance Party. Feyzioğlu became the chairman of the new party. On 29 January 1971, the party was renamed as National Reliance Party and on 4 May 1973, Republican Party, another party also issued from CHP, merged to Nationalistic Reliance Party. After merging, the party was renamed as Republican Reliance Party. Turhan Feyzioğlu continued as the chairman of Republican Reliance Party.

Politics in Republican Reliance Party
Republican Reliance Party continued up to 1980 and Turhan Feyzioğlu continued to be an MP from Kayseri Province. Although his party was losing support,  Feyzioğlu served two times as deputy prime minister in coalition governments; in 1975 in Süleyman Demirel's cabinet and in 1978 Bülent Ecevit’s cabinet.            (Cabinet Demirel IV and Cabinet Ecevit III)

Family life
Turhan Feyzioğlu married to Leyla Cıngıllıoğlu. Their daughter Saide (1950-1969) married Mehmet Buçukoğlu, but she died two hours after bearing a son, Metin, on 7 July 1969. Metin was adopted by his grandparents and took the surname Feyzioğlu. He became a professor of criminal law and was elected President of Turkish Union of Bar Associations in May 2013.

Death
After 1980 he abandoned politics. Turhan Feyzioğlu died at the age of 66 in Ankara on 24 March 1988.

Books
The following is the list of Feyzioğlu's books. Five of them are in Turkish and one in French.
 
 Kanunların Anayasaya Uygunluğunun Kazai Murakabesi (1951) 
 Demokrasiye ve Diktatörlüğe Dair (1957)
 Devlet Adamı Atatürk (1963)
 Atatürk ve Milliyetçilik
 Türk Millî Mücadelesinin ve Atatürkçülüğün Temel İlkelerinden Biri Olarak Millet Egemenliği.
 Atatürk Yolu
 Un Liberateur et un Modernisateur Genial Kemal Atatürk

References

1922 births
1988 deaths
20th-century prime ministers of Turkey
People from Kayseri
Galatasaray High School alumni
Istanbul University Faculty of Law alumni
Academic staff of Ankara University
Deputy Prime Ministers of Turkey
Republican People's Party (Turkey) politicians
Turkish non-fiction writers
Ministers of National Education of Turkey
Rectors of Middle East Technical University
Deputies of Sivas
Deputies of Kayseri
Leaders of political parties in Turkey
Republican Reliance Party politicians
Members of the 26th government of Turkey
Members of the 27th government of Turkey
Members of the 39th government of Turkey
Members of the 42nd government of Turkey
Members of the 25th government of Turkey
Turkish expatriates in the United Kingdom
Turkish political party founders